Panthea is a 1917 American silent drama film directed by Allan Dwan and starring Norma Talmadge. This was the first film Talmadge made after leaving D. W. Griffith's company to form her own production company with Joseph M. Schenck. It is believed to be a lost film. It was last shown in Venice in 1958.

Cast
Norma Talmadge as Panthea Romoff
Earle Foxe as Gerald Mordaunt
L. Rogers Lytton as Baron de Duisitor
George Fawcett as Prefect of Police
Murdock MacQuarrie as Police Agent
Erich von Stroheim as Lieutenant
Norbert Wicki as Ivan Romoff
William L. Abingdon as Sir Henry Mordaunt
Winifred Harris as Gerard's Mother
Eileen Percy as Gerard's Sister (credited as Elaine Persey)
Stafford Windsor as Percival
Richard Rosson as Pablo Centeno
Frank Currier as Dr. Von Reichstadt
Herbert Barry
Jack Meredith

Production
The film was shot at the former Biograph studio in New York.

Release
Panthea opened in U.S. theaters in January, 1917, and performed well at the box office. Talmadge made several personal appearances to help the film, often wearing her costumes from the film. It was well reviewed; Julian Johnson of Photoplay described the film as "staged with an eye both to artistic lighting and dramatic effect, true to life even in its most melodramatic moments, tingling with suspense, saturate with sympathy."

Selznick Enterprises re-released Panthea in 1923 to extremely good business. It was screened at the Venice Film Festival in 1958, but has since not been available, leading to the consensus that it is a lost film.

References

External links

 
 

1917 films
1917 drama films
Silent American drama films
American silent feature films
American black-and-white films
Lost American films
Films based on works by Monckton Hoffe
Films directed by Allan Dwan
Selznick Pictures films
1917 lost films
Lost drama films
1910s American films